Back Allegheny Mountain is a long mountain ridge in eastern West Virginia. It is part of the Shavers Fork Mountain Complex in the Allegheny Range of the Appalachians.

Geography 
The mountain rises abruptly from the Greenbrier River valley in Pocahontas County, West Virginia, and runs nearly parallel to Cheat Mountain to its west.

North of U.S. Route 250 west of Durbin, the same structural fold of the Earth's crust that forms Back Allegheny Mountain continues north as Shavers Mountain for an additional .

Preservation and recreation 
Almost the entirety of Back Allegheny Mountain is protected by the Monongahela National Forest. The summit of Bald Knob is owned by the West Virginia Division of Natural Resources. Back Allegheny and other mountains in the area are known for their extensive red spruce forests, as well as other high altitude plants and animals. The whole of Back Allegheny is an environmentally sensitive area.

Snowshoe Mountain Ski Resort is situated in the bowl-shaped convergence of Back Allegheny with Cheat Mountain at the head of Shavers Fork. This area is essentially the southern terminus of both mountains.

See also 
 Bald Knob
 Shavers Fork Mountain Complex
 Cass Scenic Railroad State Park
 Cheat Mountain
 Leatherbark Run

References

External links 
 
 

Ridges of West Virginia
Allegheny Mountains
Monongahela National Forest
Ridges of Pocahontas County, West Virginia
Landforms of Randolph County, West Virginia